Year 179 (CLXXIX) was a common year starting on Thursday (link will display the full calendar) of the Julian calendar. At the time, it was known as the Year of the Consulship of Aurelius and Veru (or, less frequently, year 932 Ab urbe condita). The denomination 179 for this year has been used since the early medieval period, when the Anno Domini calendar era became the prevalent method in Europe for naming years.

Events

By place

Roman empire 
 The Roman fort Castra Regina ("fortress by the Regen river") is built at Regensburg, on the right bank of the Danube in Germany.
 Roman legionaries of Legio II Adiutrix engrave on the rock of the Trenčín Castle (Slovakia) the name of the town Laugaritio, marking the northernmost point of Roman presence in that part of Europe.
 Marcus Aurelius drives the Marcomanni over the Danube and reinforces the border. To repopulate and rebuild a devastated Pannonia, Rome allows the first German colonists to enter territory controlled by the Roman Empire.

Asia 
 Abgar IX the Great becomes King of Edessa.
 Gogukcheon succeeds his father Shindae as King of Goguryeo.
 Han Dynasty China: The full title of the Nine Chapters on the Mathematical Art appears on two bronze standard measures dated to this year, yet there is speculation that the same book existed beforehand only under different titles. In the 3rd century, Liu Hui would provide commentary on this important early Chinese mathematical treatise.
</onlyinclude>

Births 
 Pang Tong, Chinese adviser of warlord Liu Bei (d. 214)
 Sima Yi, Chinese general and regent (d. 251)

Deaths 
 Beautiful Lady Yu, Chinese concubine and imperial consort
 Myeongnim Dap-bu, Korean prime minister (b. AD 67)
 Sindae of Goguryeo, Korean ruler (b. AD 89)
 Wang Fu, Chinese court eunuch

References